Rudolf William "Roo" Dorr (29 June 1909 – c. 1961) was a rugby union player who represented Australia.

Dorr, a wing, was born in Melbourne, Victoria and claimed a total of 2 international rugby caps for Australia.

References

Australian rugby union players
Australia international rugby union players
1909 births
1961 deaths
Rugby union players from Melbourne
Rugby union wings